Sofia Hublitz (born June 1, 1999) is an American actress.  She is best known for her role as Charlotte Byrde in the Netflix crime drama series Ozark (2017–2022).

Early life
Hublitz was born in Richmond, Virginia, on June 1, 1999. Due to her mother's work as a screen art director, she became familiar with film production from an early age. The family moved to New York City in 2007.

Career
Hublitz first appeared on TV as a contestant on MasterChef Junior in 2013. At one point, she was seen crying over a mistake she had made during one of the tasks, with Gordon Ramsay comforting her and assisting her in redoing the task. The following year, she landed her first acting role as Danielle Hoffman in two episodes of Louis C.K.'s television series Louie, and a young Sylvia in an episode of Horace and Pete in 2016. From 2017 to 2022, she starred as Charlotte Byrde in the Netflix series Ozark.

Filmography

Film

Television

Awards and nominations

References

External links
 

1999 births
Living people
American people of German descent
21st-century American actresses
Contestants on American game shows
Actresses from Richmond, Virginia